Mercenary for Justice is a 2006 action thriller film directed and shot by Don E. FauntLeRoy. It stars Steven Seagal, Luke Goss, Jacqueline Lord and Roger Guenveur Smith. The film was released on direct-to-video on April 18, 2006. Principal photography was on location in Cape Town, South Africa.

Plot
CIA dirty deeds man John Dresham (Luke Goss) and black ops organiser Anthony Chapel (Roger Guenveur Smith) hire mercenary John Seeger (Steven Seagal) and his crew for a mission in the French-controlled Galmoral Island in Southern Africa. Ostensibly, the purpose of the operation is to aid the local population, though in reality Dresham and Chapel plan to seize and profit off the island's rich oil and diamond reserves.

Seeger gets steamed when the mission goes wrong. Some of his soldiers, against Seeger's orders, take the French Ambassador (Rudiger Eberle) and his family hostage for leverage and later blow them all up. French troops arrive and attack the mercenaries, resulting in his best friend "Radio" Jones (Zaa Nkweta) being killed. Maxine Barnol, his spy posing as a journalist, suggests CIA involvement.

Seeger heads back to the United States and goes to the home of Radio's wife Shondra (Faye Peters), tells her the news, and then promises her that he will take care of her and her young son Eddie (Tumi Mogoje). While there he kills two of Dresham's men sent to kill him and discovers Dresham's implication.

Chapel again hires the team of mercenaries, kidnapping Shondra and Eddie to force John into cooperating. The mission involves rescuing Kamal Dasan, the son of prominent gun runner Ahmet Dasan (Peter Butler), who has been arrested and thrown into the Randveld Prison outside of Cape Town, South Africa, and is due to be extradited to the United States.

Dresham discovers the job but not its object and when he bumps into Maxine he forces her to work for him instead of Chapel. Maxine leads him to believe that the target is the safe of a bank in Cape Town and Dresham uses his CIA influence to be shown round the security installation. Maxine listens attentively and takes photos.

Seeger leads Dresham in circles but when the mercenaries break into the prison they discover that Kamal is not there any more. In the Cape Town bank, Seeger persuades the Greek government to arrest Kamal's father, then escapes making sure Dresham will be arrested too.

Finally, with a few loyal members of his team, John rescues Shondra and Eddie and kills Chapel and his guards.

Cast

Production
Filming took 28 days. The director later said "the story was confusing because there were four writers on the film and things were left over from draft to draft. I pointed all this out to the producers, but they did not care. Also, the producers cut scene number 101 from the shooting schedule that played right in the middle of the film it caused a domino effect before and after. That scene was the tie-up in the movie. I talked until I was blue in the face trying to convince them the decision was a huge mistake. They did not care."

Fauntleroy said scene 101 was where Maxine and Seeger meet up and set the plan in motion to expose Chapel and Dresham. "A fight sequence was to take place as Seeger left the Hotel where Seagal had to take on four guys so Maxine could slip away."

Fauntleroy claims the producers "just hated Steven and their whole existence was to destroy him, staff of personal, and the film."

Lawsuit
Fauntleroy claimed the day he arrived on the film the producers "showed me a law suit that had already been prepared and was ready to file if Steven gave them any problems."

Nu Image, Inc., and Kill Master Productions sued Seagal for $14 million, claiming the actor caused production delays on the set of "Mercenary" and a second film, Today You Die by routinely arriving late on the set, rewriting the script and allowing members of his entourage to interfere with the work of crew members. The lawsuit was settled out of court.

References

External links 
 
 
Review of film at Ain't It Cool News

2006 films
2006 action thriller films
2006 direct-to-video films
American action thriller films
Direct-to-video action films
2000s English-language films
English-language South African films
Films about the Central Intelligence Agency
Films set in South Africa
Films set in Cape Town
MoviePass Films films
Nu Image films
South African action thriller films
Films directed by Don E. FauntLeRoy
2000s American films